Monclova Christian Academy is a private Christian school in Monclova, Ohio, United States, southwest of Toledo.  It is a ministry of Monclova Road Baptist Church.

Monclova Christian Academy was founded in 1999. 

In 2008, a preschool class was added to the academy. Monclova Christian Academy has continued to serve the surrounding communities through excellence in Christian Education.

External links
 School Website

Baptist schools in the United States
Christian schools in Ohio
High schools in Lucas County, Ohio
Private high schools in Ohio
Private middle schools in Ohio
Private elementary schools in Ohio